Farhadabad may refer to:
Farhadabad, Fars, Iran
Farhadabad, Ilam, Iran
Farhadabad, Khuzestan, Iran
Farhadabad, Kurdistan, Iran
Farhadabad, Delfan, Lorestan Province, Iran
Farhadabad, Selseleh, Lorestan Province, Iran
Farhadabad Union, Bangladesh